Arturo Carrari (1867–1935) was an early Italian-Brazilian film director, film producer, screenwriter and occasional actor best known for his work in the Brazilian cinema in the 1920s.

Director filmography
Os Milagres de Nossa Senhora da Aparecida (1916)
24 Horas na Vida de Uma Mulher Elegante (1920)
O Crime de Cravinhos (1920)
Um Crime no Parque Paulista (1921)
Amor de Filha (1922)
O Furto dos 500 Milhões de Réis (1922)
Os Milagres de Nossa Senhora da Penha (1923)
Manhãs de Sol (1925)
Amor de Mãe (1927)
Anchieta Entre o Amor e a Religião (1932)

References

External links

Brazilian film directors
Brazilian film producers
Brazilian screenwriters
Italian film directors
Italian film producers
20th-century Italian screenwriters
1867 births
1935 deaths
Film people from Modena
Italian emigrants to Brazil
Italian male screenwriters
20th-century Italian male writers